Dennis Franz Schlachta (born October 28, 1944), known professionally as Dennis Franz, is an American retired actor best known for his role as NYPD Detective Andy Sipowicz in the ABC television series NYPD Blue (1993–2005), a role that earned him a Golden Globe Award, three Screen Actors Guild Awards and four Primetime Emmy Awards. He also portrayed two different characters on the similar NBC series Hill Street Blues (1983, 1985–1987) and its short-lived spinoff, Beverly Hills Buntz (1987–1988).

Early life
Franz was born October 28, 1944, in Maywood, Illinois, the son of German immigrants Eleanor ( Mueller), a postal worker, and Franz Ferdinand Schlachta, who was a baker and postal worker of German & Polish descent. He has two older sisters, Heidi Deigl (born 1935) and Marlene Schraut (born 1938).

Franz is a 1962 graduate of Proviso East High School in Maywood. During his high school years, he was active in baseball, football and swimming. He attended Wilbur Wright College and Southern Illinois University Carbondale, graduating from the latter with a bachelor's degree in speech and theater in 1968.

After graduating from college, Franz was drafted into the United States Army. He served eleven months with the 82nd Airborne Division and the 101st Airborne Division in Vietnam.

Career

Franz began his acting career at Chicago's Organic Theater Company. Although he has in the past performed Shakespeare, his appearance led to his being typecast early in his career as a cop. (By Franz's own count, the character of Andy Sipowicz was his 28th role as a police officer). He also guest starred in shows such as The A-Team. Other major roles were on the television series Hill Street Blues in which he played two characters over the run of the show. Franz first played the role of the corrupt Detective Sal Benedetto in the 1982–1983 season. Benedetto eventually commits suicide when a large-scale scam he was running fails. Franz returned to the series in 1985 as main character Lt. Norman Buntz, remaining until the show's end in 1987. He also starred in the short-lived Beverly Hills Buntz as the same character.

During the late 1970s and early 1980s, Franz worked regularly with directors Brian De Palma and Robert Altman. He appeared in three of Altman's films from this period, and five of De Palma's, most prominently as a low-budget movie director in Body Double (1984).

Franz went on to win four Emmy Awards for his portrayal of Andy Sipowicz on NYPD Blue. The character of Sipowicz was ranked No. 23 on Bravo's 100 Greatest TV Characters list. In 1996, while still on NYPD Blue, Franz appeared in the Disney cartoon Mighty Ducks: The Animated Series in which he provided the voice of Captain Klegghorn, the commanding officer and head of the Anaheim Police Department. The series ran from September 1996 to January 1997.

In 1994, Franz made a cameo appearance as himself in The Simpsons episode "Homer Badman", in which Homer is accused of sexually harassing a babysitter and the case becomes tabloid fodder, generating an exploitative television movie, Homer S.: Portrait of an Ass-Grabber, in which Franz portrays Homer.

On May 11, 2001, Franz was a contestant on a celebrity edition of the hit television game show Who Wants to Be a Millionaire, winning $250,000 for his charity, the National Colorectal Cancer Research Alliance.

Franz also was a commercial spokesman for Nextel in the early 2000s. The concept was that Franz "refused" to do the commercials, saying they were not something he did.

He starred as Earl, the abusive husband, in the Dixie Chicks' music video "Goodbye Earl", and a role in country star Sammy Kershaw's music video "Queen of My Double Wide Trailer", as airport police captain Carmine Lorenzo in the 1990 film Die Hard 2 and as Nathaniel Messinger in the 1998 film City of Angels. It was his final film role to date.

Post-NYPD Blue
After the end of the show in 2005, Franz retired from acting to focus on his private life. He has told the New York Post he would be interested in returning to acting if given the right opportunity. He and his wife spend their summers in their lake home in northern Idaho. He spoke of wartime experiences and post-war trauma of veterans at a Memorial Day Concert in 2012. (He spoke in the first person but it was not his own story.) He and his former NYPD Blue co-star Jimmy Smits made a surprise appearance at the 2016 Primetime Emmy Awards, presenting the award for Outstanding Drama Series to Game of Thrones.

Personal life
In 1995, Franz married Joanie Zeck; they met in 1982. He is the stepfather of Zeck's two daughters from her previous marriage.

Filmography

Film

Television

Awards and nominations

Trivia

There is a reference to Franz in the 2005 novel Shalimar the Clown by Salman Rushdie.

References

External links

 
 

1944 births
20th-century American male actors
21st-century American male actors
American Jews
American male film actors
American male television actors
American male voice actors
American people of German descent
American people of Jewish descent
American people of Polish descent
American male stage actors
American male Shakespearean actors
Best Drama Actor Golden Globe (television) winners
Living people
Male actors from Chicago
Outstanding Performance by a Lead Actor in a Drama Series Primetime Emmy Award winners
Outstanding Performance by a Male Actor in a Drama Series Screen Actors Guild Award winners
People from Maywood, Illinois
Southern Illinois University Carbondale alumni
United States Army soldiers
United States Army personnel of the Vietnam War
Wilbur Wright College alumni